Giovanni Lanfranco (born 9 May 1956) is a retired Italian volleyball player. He was part of Italian teams that finished second at the 1975 Mediterranean Games and 1978 World Championships, third at the 1984 Summer Olympics, eighth at the 1976 Summer Olympics, and ninth at the 1980 Summer Olympics.

References

1956 births
Living people
Italian men's volleyball players
Olympic volleyball players of Italy
Volleyball players at the 1976 Summer Olympics
Volleyball players at the 1980 Summer Olympics
Volleyball players at the 1984 Summer Olympics
Olympic bronze medalists for Italy
Sportspeople from Turin
Olympic medalists in volleyball
Medalists at the 1984 Summer Olympics
Mediterranean Games silver medalists for Italy
Competitors at the 1975 Mediterranean Games
Mediterranean Games medalists in volleyball